The Miss Ecuador 1973, Patricia Rivadeneira of Cuenca, was crowned on April 30, 1973 in Telecentro by Miss Ecuador 1972, Patricia Falconi from Pichincha. She did not compete at Miss Universe 1973 nor Miss World 1973, instead, she competed at Miss Maja in Zaragoza, Spain.

Casting

A casting was held in 1973 to select an Ecuadorian representative to compete at Miss Maja 1973. She did not compete at Miss Universe 1973 nor Miss World 1973.

References

External links

Miss Ecuador